Valdokurye is a rural locality (a village) in Pinezhskoye Rural Settlement of Pinezhsky District, Arkhangelsk Oblast, Russia. The population was 41 as of 2010.

Geography 
Valdokurye is located on the Pinega River, 148 km northwest of Karpogory (the district's administrative centre) by road. Maletino is the nearest rural locality.

References 

Rural localities in Pinezhsky District